Christopher or Chris Field may refer to:

 Chris Field (composer), American singer, songwriter, film composer
 Chris Field (general), Australian Army officer
 Christopher Field, Nobel laureate director of the Carnegie Institution's Department of Global Ecology